Ababeel (ابابیل), also known as Ababeel NGO is a charitable trust that provides emergency assistance, disaster relief, food kits and blood donations for needy, poor, orphan and widows and also in emergency in the Chenab Valley's Doda, Kishtwar, Thathri, Bhaderwah, Gandoh and also in Jammu area. The organization assists people irrespective of caste and religion. It is the registered with Sub Registrar Court Doda.

Ababeel was founded in July, 2015 by Hassan Babur Nehru and registered in Sub Registrar Office Doda by Syed Imtiaz, Muzammil Wahidi, Mudassir Hassan and Burhan Mir.

History
Ababeel was started in Doda and after gap of some months, Kishtwar unit of Ababeel created. Later, several more units created under the same registration in Thathri, Bhaderwah, Gandoh area of Chenab Valley and Jammu district of Jammu and Kashmir union territory.
It was founded in 2015 after 2014 Kashmir Floods destroyed many lives in Kashmir valley. The founder of Ababeel collected relief material in Doda for flood effected Kashmiris and went voluntarily with some associates to Kashmir to distribute them. But when they reach Kashmir, some associates suggested to write any name on the packs of relief material so that people remember Doda area had helped them.

One of the associates suggested "Ababeel" means "a group which is united and scattered". The Logo of Ababeel Charitable Trust consists of a Swallow bird and its Arabic name Ababeel in alphabets. The dictionary meaning of ABABEEL is a group which is united and scattered. The bird Ababeel (Arabic: أبابيل, romanized: abābīl) refers to the miraculous birds in Islamic belief mentioned in Sura 105 of the Quran that protected the Ka'ba in Mecca from the Aksumite elephant army of Abraha, then self-styled governor of Himyar, by dropping small clay stones on them as they approached. Hence, the name Ababeel selected for writing on the relief material. Later, Adv Hassan Babur Nehru, Dr Muzammil Wahidi and their associates registered this name Ababeel as Charitable Trust in Sub Registrar Office Doda.

Mission
The people who work with this charitable organization works voluntarily. The volunteers works on the Humanitarian grounds influenced by Islamic teachings of Muhammad, last prophet in Islam on Social Work. There are more than 500 volunteers in this organization. The volunteers help the local administration and people in all emergencies, whether road accidents, earthquakes, landslides, or rescuing people drowned in Chenab River.

Rescue operations
Ababeel, a well-known humanitarian organization has many successful rescue operations.
A tragedic road Accident in Kishtwar results 36 death and dozens of injured. Ababeel was one of the first organizations started rescue operation there. Due to which many people's lives were saved.

On 4 February 2020, Ababeel volunteers started rescue operation in Doda, where the brought the bodies of two people—died in a road accident.

On 27 July 2021, A cloudburst hits Hunzar hamlet of Dachhan area in Kishtwar district. As on 29 July 2021, reports said 7 dead bodies have been recovered, 19 persons are still missing while 5 critically injured airlifted to district hospital Kishtwar and Ababeel team, SDRF, Police and Army is on rescue operation in the area.

Humanitarian aid
Ababeel is also known for assistance of needy, widows and orphans. The Ababeel provides monthly food kits to the destitute, needy, orphans and widows.

During the month of Ramadan, Ababeel adds Khajur in their kits for Muslim families. Also, they distribute the Eid Kits.

In emergencies, Ababeel reach far flung areas of Chenab Valley—a hilly area, to distribute food kits. On 16 April 2020, they visited a Hindu dominated area Padder for helping 60 needy Hindu families where they were detained by Padder Police for donating relief material to needy families amid Coronavirus Lockdown.

Sehri program
Sehri program for the patients and their attendants in the Hospitals is a part of Ababeel. Various units of Ababeel serve Sehri in Hospitals since 2016.

External links

References

Charities based in India
2015 establishments in Jammu and Kashmir
Organisations based in Jammu and Kashmir